Blessing Muhwati (born 14 July 1995) is a Zimbabwean professional squash player. He achieved his highest career PSA singles ranking of 159 in August 2019.

References

External links 

 Profile at PSA
 

1995 births
Living people
Zimbabwean male squash players
Sportspeople from Harare